Pierre Jean Capretz (30 January 1925 – 2 April 2014) was a French educator and writer, noted for his audio-visual methods for teaching French. A graduate of the University of Paris, he began teaching French in 1949 at the University of Florida and joined the faculty of Yale University in 1956, eventually becoming Director of the Language Laboratory and then Director of the Language Development Studio. He is best known as the creator and host of the PBS television series French in Action.  He received an honorary Doctor of Letters from Middlebury College in August 1993. He died in 2014 at the age of 89.

List of degrees received
Doctorate, University of Paris, 1950
Law Degree, University of Paris, 1947
Doctor of Letters, Honoris Causa, Middlebury College, 1993

References

Hodge, Deborah (Autumn 1993). Introduction, "A Banner Year for the Language Schools", Middlebury Magazine.

External links
University of Florida Language Learning Center
Language Development Studio

Yale University faculty
University of Florida faculty
1925 births
2014 deaths
French male writers